The 1902 Delaware football team represented Delaware College—now known as the University of Delaware–as an independent during the 1902 college football season. Led by first-year head coach Clarence A. Short, Delaware compiled a record of 3–5–1.

Schedule

References

Delaware
Delaware Fightin' Blue Hens football seasons
Delaware football